Steven Michael Jennings (born July 24, 1969, in Bethesda, Maryland) is a former field hockey midfielder, who competed for the United States since 1991 and finished twelfth with the national team at the 1996 Summer Olympics in Atlanta, Georgia. He is currently head coach at the American University in Washington DC for over 22 seasons.

References
 Bethesda Magazine Article 
 AU Eagles 
 Southern Living article (1996) 
 Video clip featuring exclusive interview with Steve Jennings

External links
 

1969 births
Living people
American male field hockey players
Olympic field hockey players of the United States
Field hockey players at the 1996 Summer Olympics
People from Bethesda, Maryland
University of Maryland, College Park alumni
Pan American Games bronze medalists for the United States
Pan American Games medalists in field hockey
Field hockey players at the 1995 Pan American Games
Medalists at the 1995 Pan American Games